Bruno Parovel (6 October 1913 in Koper, Austria-Hungary – 1994) was an Italian rower who competed in the 1932 Summer Olympics.

In 1932 he won the silver medal as member of the Italian boat in the coxed fours competition.

External links
Bruno Parovel's profile at databaseOlympics.com
Bruno Parovel's profile at Sports Reference.com
Report on Italian Olympic rowers 

1913 births
1994 deaths
Sportspeople from Koper
Italian male rowers
Olympic rowers of Italy
Rowers at the 1932 Summer Olympics
Olympic silver medalists for Italy
Olympic medalists in rowing
Medalists at the 1932 Summer Olympics